Albert Ejupi (born 28 August 1992) is a Swedish footballer who plays as a midfielder for Austrian club TSV Hartberg.

Career

Varbergs BoIS
Prior to the 2018 season, Ejupi joined the club on a free transfer. Following Varbergs BoIS' promotion to the Allsvenskan prior to the 2020 season, Ejupi made his top-flight debut on 15 June 2020, playing the entirety of a 3–0 away victory over Helsingborg.

Helsingborgs IF
Ejupi joined Helsingborgs IF in the Allsvenskan in March 2022.

TSV Hartberg
On 10 June 2022, Ejupi signed a two-year contract with TSV Hartberg in Austria.

Personal life
Born in Sweden, Ejupi is of Kosovan descent.

References

External links
Albert Ejupi at Football Database

1992 births
Living people
Swedish footballers
Swedish people of Kosovan descent
Mjällby AIF players
Varbergs BoIS players
Helsingborgs IF players
TSV Hartberg players
Ettan Fotboll players
Superettan players
Allsvenskan players
Association football midfielders
Swedish expatriate footballers
Expatriate footballers in Austria
Swedish expatriate sportspeople in Austria
Footballers from Stockholm